Maria Teresa of Bourbon-Two Sicilies (Full Italian name: Principessa Maria Teresa Maddalena  di Borbone delle Due Sicilie) (15 January 1867, Zürich, Switzerland – 1 March 1909, Cannes, France) was the only child of Prince Louis of Bourbon-Two Sicilies, Count of Trani (heir apparent of the defunct throne of the Two Sicilies) and his wife Duchess Mathilde Ludovika in Bavaria. Maria Teresa was a member of the House of Bourbon-Two Sicilies and became a member of the House of Hohenzollern-Sigmaringen and titular Princess of Hohenzollern through her marriage to Prince Wilhelm of Hohenzollern (later Prince of Hohenzollern). She was called Mädi in the family and had a lifelong friendship with her cousin the Archduchess Marie Valerie of Austria.

Marriage and issue

Maria Teresa married Prince Wilhelm of Hohenzollern, eldest son of Leopold, Prince of Hohenzollern and Infanta Antónia of Portugal, on 27 June 1889 in Sigmaringen. Maria Teresa and Wilhelm had three children:

Augusta Victoria of Hohenzollern (19 August 1890 – 29 August 1966). Married first Manuel II of Portugal and secondly Robert, Count Douglas.
Prince Frederick Victor of Hohenzollern (30 August 1891 – 6 February 1965). Married Princess Margarete Karola of Saxony. She was a daughter of Frederick Augustus III of Saxony and Archduchess Luise, Princess of Tuscany.
Prince Francis Joseph of Hohenzollern adopted the title Prince of Hohenzolllern-Emden (30 August 1891 – 3 April 1964).  He married Princess Maria Alix of Saxony, also a daughter of Frederick Augustus III of Saxony and Archduchess Luise, Princess of Tuscany.

Later life
Maria Teresa's husband succeeded his father as Prince of Hohenzollern on 8 June 1905. For many years, Maria Teresa had poor health. As the climate in Sigmaringen was not suitable for her constitution, she lived mostly in Bad Tölz (in the summers) and Cannes (in the winters), and was treated to regular visits from her family. It was in Cannes that she died, most likely of multiple sclerosis, on 1 May 1909 after almost four years as Princess of Hohenzollern.

According to Queen of Romania ‘Madi’ as she was called “was extremely thin, with pale blue eyes and a pathetic voice. Her health was not robust and she was quite an invalid, wheeled about in a chair, before she died at the age of 42… she saw very little of her children to whom she was a mother in name more than fact… Madi’s one great love was her mother, Countess Trani, sister of Empress Elizabeth of Austria… poor Madi.. seldom crossed my path” - ‘The Story of my Life - Marie, Queen of Roumania’

Honours
 : Dame of the Order of Louise, 1st Class
 :
 Grand Cordon of the Order of Elizabeth
 Dame of the Starry Cross, 1st Class
 : Dame of the Order of Queen Saint Isabel

Ancestry

References

External links

1867 births
1909 deaths
People from Zürich
Swiss Roman Catholics
Princesses of Bourbon-Two Sicilies
Princesses of Hohenzollern-Sigmaringen
Neurological disease deaths in France
Deaths from multiple sclerosis
Dames of the Order of Saint Isabel